Glycinol  may refer to:
 a synonym for ethanolamine
 Glycinol (pterocarpan), a phytoalexin found in soybean